Enköpings SK FK is the football club of the Swedish sports club Enköpings SK, located in Enköping.

Enköpings SK FK are affiliated to the Upplands Fotbollförbund. They play their home matches at the Enavallen in Enköping.

History
Since their foundation on 2 March 1914 Enköpings SK has participated mainly in the middle and upper divisions of the Swedish football league system.  Their best period has been over the last decade with 6 seasons in the Superettan and one in the Allsvenskan in 2003. Following consecutive demotions in 2008 and 2009 the club currently plays in Division 2 Norra Svealand which is the fourth tier of Swedish football.

Season-to-season

Honours

League
 Superettan:
 Runners-up (1): 2002
 Division 1 Norra:
 Winners (1): 2006
 Division 2 Norra Svealand:
 Winners (1): 2011
 Division 3 Norra Svealand:
 Winners (1): 2018

Records
 Attendance record: 9,102 against Djurgårdens IF (11 May 2003)
 Biggest home win: Allsvenskan: 3–1 v GIF Sundsvall v Örebro SK 2–0 (2003)
 Biggest away win: Allsvenskan: 0–4 v Helsingborgs IF (2 June 2003)
 Biggest home defeat: Allsvenskan: 0–4 v Djurgårdens IF, 0–4 v Halmstads BK (2003)
 Biggest away defeat: Allsvenskan: 0–7 v Hammarby IF (round 23, 2003)
 All-time top scorer: Kjell Mattsson with 247 goals

Attendances

In recent seasons Enköpings SK have had the following average attendances:

External links
 Enköpings SK – Official Website

Footnotes

Football clubs in Uppsala County
Allsvenskan clubs
Association football clubs established in 1914
Bandy clubs established in 1914
1914 establishments in Sweden